Cintura (Portuguese for "waist") is the eighth album from the band Clã.

Most songs were written by Hélder Gonçalves and Carlos Tê. Also participated in writing Arnaldo Antunes (Vamos esta Noite, Pra Continuar) and  Adolfo Luxúria Canibal (Fábrica de Amores). The album features the guest appearances from Paulo Furtado in Tira a Teima (voice), Fernanda Takai in Amuo (voice) and Mário Barreiros in Sexto Andar (drums).

Track listing

External links
Official Website, with info about this and other albums of the band
Official Myspace

2007 albums
Clã albums